WLTA (1400 AM) is a commercial Christian radio station licensed to Alpharetta, Georgia, and serving the Atlanta metropolitan area.  It is owned by Salem Communications along with its sister station AM 970 WNIV in Atlanta.  WLTA is a full-time simulcast of WNIV's Christian talk and teaching programming.

WLTA broadcasts with 1,000 watts of power, using a non-directional antenna and is considered a Class C station by the Federal Communications Commission (FCC).  WLTA's transmitter is located on Northwinds Parkway near U.S. Route 19 in Alpharetta.  WLTA's broadcast antenna uses a loaded UHF/VHF mast.

History
The station first signed on the air on August 25, 1986.

The radio station's former call signs were WQRZ, WAZX, WWXX, WRAF, and WVNF ("the Voice of North Fulton"), and was once licensed to the neighboring city of Roswell, Georgia.

This station is not to be confused with the former WLTA FM 99.7, which was an easy listening and later soft adult contemporary station covering the same market.

References

External links

RecNet query

Talk radio stations in the United States
Radio stations established in 1979
1979 establishments in Georgia (U.S. state)
Salem Media Group properties
LTA